Goz Beïda Airport  is a public use airport located  east-southeast of Goz Beïda, Sila, Chad.

See also
List of airports in Chad

References

External links 
 Airport record for Goz Beïda Airport at Landings.com

Airports in Chad
Sila Region